Mithraism, also known as the Mithraic mysteries or the Cult of Mithras, was a Roman mystery religion centered on the god Mithras. Although inspired by Iranian worship of the Zoroastrian divinity (yazata) Mithra, the Roman Mithras is linked to a new and distinctive imagery, with the level of continuity between Persian and Greco-Roman practice debated.
The mysteries were popular among the Imperial Roman army from about the 1st to the 4th-century CE.

Worshippers of Mithras had a complex system of seven grades of initiation and communal ritual meals. Initiates called themselves syndexioi, those "united by the handshake". They met in underground temples, now called mithraea (singular mithraeum), which survive in large numbers. The cult appears to have had its center in Rome, and was popular throughout the western half of the empire, as far south as Roman Africa and Numidia, as far west as Roman Dacia, as far north as Roman Britain, and to a lesser extent in Roman Syria in the east.

Mithraism is viewed as a rival of early Christianity. In the 4th century, Mithraists faced persecution from Christians, and the religion was subsequently suppressed and eliminated in the Roman empire by the end of the century.

Numerous archaeological finds, including meeting places, monuments and artifacts, have contributed to modern knowledge about Mithraism throughout the Roman Empire.
The iconic scenes of Mithras show him being born from a rock, slaughtering a bull, and sharing a banquet with the god Sol (the Sun). About 420 sites have yielded materials related to the cult. Among the items found are about 1000 inscriptions, 700 examples of the bull-killing scene (tauroctony), and about 400 other monuments.
It has been estimated that there would have been at least 680 mithraea in the city of Rome. No written narratives or theology from the religion survive; limited information can be derived from the inscriptions and brief or passing references in Greek and Latin literature. Interpretation of the physical evidence remains problematic and contested.

Name
The term "Mithraism" is a modern convention. Writers of the Roman era referred to it by phrases such as "Mithraic mysteries", "mysteries of Mithras" or "mysteries of the Persians". Modern sources sometimes refer to the Greco-Roman religion as Roman Mithraism or Western Mithraism to distinguish it from Persian worship of Mithra.

Etymology of Mithras

The name Mithras (Latin, equivalent to Greek "") is a form of Mithra, the name of an old, pre-Zoroastrian, and, later on, Zoroastrian, god – a relationship understood by Mithraic scholars since the days of Franz Cumont.
An early example of the Greek form of the name is in a 4th century BCE work by Xenophon, the Cyropaedia, which is a biography of the Persian king Cyrus the Great.

The exact form of a Latin or classical Greek word varies due to the grammatical process of inflection. There is archaeological evidence that in Latin worshippers wrote the nominative form of the god's name as "Mithras". Porphyry's Greek text De Abstinentia (Περὶ ἀποχῆς ἐμψύχων), has a reference to the now-lost histories of the Mithraic mysteries by Euboulus and Pallas, the wording of which suggests that these authors treated the name "Mithra" as an indeclinable foreign word.

Related deity-names in other languages include:
 Vedic Sanskrit Mitra, "friend, friendship," as the name of a god praised in the Rigveda.
In Sanskrit, mitra  is a name of the sun god, mostly known as "Surya" or "Aditya".
 the form mi-it-ra-, found in an inscribed peace treaty between the Hittites and the kingdom of Mitanni, from about 1400 BCE. between the king of the Hittites, Subbiluliuma, and the king of Mitanni, Mativaza. ... It is the earliest evidence of Mithras in Asia Minor.

Iranian Mithra and Sanskrit Mitra are believed to come from an Indo-Iranian word mitrás, meaning "contract, agreement, covenant".

Modern historians have different conceptions about whether these names refer to the same god or not. John R. Hinnells has written of Mitra / Mithra / Mithras as a single deity, worshipped in several different religions. On the other hand, David Ulansey considers the bull-slaying Mithras to be a new god who began to be worshipped in the 1st century BCE, and to whom an old name was applied.

Mary Boyce, a researcher of ancient Iranian religions, writes that even though Roman Mithraism seems to have had less Iranian content than historians used to think, nonetheless "as the name Mithras alone shows, this content was of some importance".

Iconography

Much about the cult of Mithras is only known from reliefs and sculptures.  There have been many attempts to interpret this material.

Mithras-worship in the Roman Empire was characterized by images of the god slaughtering a bull. Other images of Mithras are found in the Roman temples, for instance Mithras banqueting with Sol, and depictions of the birth of Mithras from a rock. But the image of bull-slaying (tauroctony) is always in the central niche. Textual sources for a reconstruction of the theology behind this iconography are very rare. (See section Interpretations of the bull-slaying scene below.)

The practice of depicting the god slaying a bull seems to be specific to Roman Mithraism. According to David Ulansey, this is "perhaps the most important example" of evident difference between Iranian and Roman traditions: "... there is no evidence that the Iranian god Mithra ever had anything to do with killing a bull."

Bull-slaying scene 

In every mithraeum the centerpiece was a representation of Mithras killing a sacred bull, an act called the tauroctony.
The image may be a relief, or free-standing, and side details may be present or omitted. The centre-piece is Mithras clothed in Anatolian costume and wearing a Phrygian cap; who is kneeling on the exhausted bull, holding it by the nostrils with his left hand, and stabbing it with his right. As he does so, he looks over his shoulder towards the figure of Sol. A dog and a snake reach up towards the blood. A scorpion seizes the bull's genitals. A raven is flying around or is sitting on the bull. One or three ears of wheat are seen coming out from the bull's tail, sometimes from the wound. The bull was often white. The god is sitting on the bull in an unnatural way with his right leg constraining the bull's hoof and the left leg is bent and resting on the bull's back or flank. The two torch-bearers are on either side are dressed like Mithras: Cautes with his torch pointing up, and Cautopates with his torch pointing down. Sometimes Cautes and Cautopates carry shepherds' crooks instead of torches.

The event takes place in a cavern, into which Mithras has carried the bull, after having hunted it, ridden it and overwhelmed its strength. Sometimes the cavern is surrounded by a circle, on which the twelve signs of the zodiac appear. Outside the cavern, top left, is Sol the sun, with his flaming crown, often driving a quadriga. A ray of light often reaches down to touch Mithras. At the top right is Luna, with her crescent moon, who may be depicted driving a biga.

In some depictions, the central tauroctony is framed by a series of subsidiary scenes to the left, top and right, illustrating events in the Mithras narrative; Mithras being born from the rock, the water miracle, the hunting and riding of the bull, meeting Sol who kneels to him, shaking hands with Sol and sharing a meal of bull-parts with him, and ascending to the heavens in a chariot. In some instances, as is the case in the stucco icon at Santa Prisca Mithraeum in Rome, the god is shown heroically nude. Some of these reliefs were constructed so that they could be turned on an axis. On the back side was another, more elaborate feasting scene. This indicates that the bull killing scene was used in the first part of the celebration, then the relief was turned, and the second scene was used in the second part of the celebration.
Besides the main cult icon, a number of mithraea had several secondary tauroctonies, and some small portable versions, probably meant for private devotion, have also been found.

Banquet
The second most important scene after the tauroctony in Mithraic art is the so-called banquet scene. The banquet scene features Mithras and Sol Invictus banqueting on the hide of the slaughtered bull. On the specific banquet scene on the Fiano Romano relief, one of the torchbearers points a caduceus towards the base of an altar, where flames appear to spring up. Robert Turcan has argued that since the caduceus is an attribute of Mercury, and in mythology Mercury is depicted as a psychopomp, the eliciting of flames in this scene is referring to the dispatch of human souls and expressing the Mithraic doctrine on this matter. Turcan also connects this event to the tauroctony: The blood of the slain bull has soaked the ground at the base of the altar, and from the blood the souls are elicited in flames by the caduceus.

Birth from a rock

Mithras is depicted as being born from a rock. He is shown as emerging from a rock, already in his youth,  with a dagger in one hand and a torch in the other. He is nude, standing with his legs together, and is wearing a Phrygian cap.

In some variations, he is shown coming out of the rock as a child, and in one holds a globe in one hand; sometimes a thunderbolt is seen. There are also depictions in which flames are shooting from the rock and also from Mithras' cap. One statue had its base perforated so that it could serve as a fountain, and the base of another has the mask of the water god. Sometimes Mithras also has other weapons such as bows and arrows, and there are also animals such as dogs, serpents, dolphins, eagles, other birds, lions, crocodiles, lobsters and snails around. On some reliefs, there is a bearded figure identified as Oceanus, the water god, and on some there are the gods of the four winds. In these reliefs, the four elements could be invoked together. Sometimes Victoria, Luna, Sol, and Saturn also seem to play a role. Saturn in particular is often seen handing over the dagger or short sword to Mithras, used later in the tauroctony.

In some depictions, Cautes and Cautopates are also present; sometimes they are depicted as shepherds.

On some occasions, an amphora is seen, and a few instances show variations like an egg birth or a tree birth. Some interpretations show that the birth of Mithras was celebrated by lighting torches or candles.

Lion-headed figure

One of the most characteristic and poorly-understood features of the Mysteries is the naked lion-headed figure often found in Mithraic temples, named by the modern scholars with descriptive terms such as leontocephaline (lion-headed) or leontocephalus (lion-head).

His body is a naked man's, entwined by a serpent (or two serpents, like a caduceus), with the snake's head often resting on the lion's head. The lion's mouth is often open. He is usually represented as having four wings, two keys (sometimes a single key), and a sceptre in his hand. Sometimes the figure is standing on a globe inscribed with a diagonal cross. On the figure from the Ostia Antica Mithraeum (left, CIMRM 312), the four wings carry the symbols of the four seasons, and a thunderbolt is engraved on his chest. At the base of the statue are the hammer and tongs of Vulcan and Mercury's cock and wand (caduceus). A rare variation of the same figure is also found with a human head and a lion's head emerging from its chest.

Although animal-headed figures are prevalent in contemporary Egyptian and Gnostic mythological representations, no exact parallel to the Mithraic leontocephaline figure has been found.

Based on dedicatory inscriptions for altars, the name of the figure is conjectured to be Arimanius, a Latinized form of the name Ahriman – a demonic figure in the Zoroastrian pantheon. Arimanius is known from inscriptions to have been a god in the Mithraic cult as seen, for example, in images from the Corpus Inscriptionum et Monumentorum Religionis Mithriacae (CIMRM) such as CIMRM 222 from Ostia, CIMRM 369 from Rome, and CIMRM 1773 and 1775 from Pannonia.

Some scholars identify the lion-man as Aion, or Zurvan, or Cronus, or Chronos, while others assert that it is a version of the Zoroastrian Ahriman or Vedic Aryaman.
Although the exact identity of the lion-headed figure is debated by scholars, it is largely agreed that the god is associated with time and seasonal change.

Rituals and worship
According to M.J. Vermaseren and C.C. van Essen, the Mithraic New Year and the birthday of Mithras was on December 25.
Beck disagreed strongly.
Clauss states:
 "The Mithraic Mysteries had no public ceremonies of its own. The festival of Natalis Invicti, held on 25 December, was a general festival of the Sun, and by no means specific to the Mysteries of Mithras."

Mithraic initiates were required to swear an oath of secrecy and dedication.

Mithraic catechism
Apparently, some grade rituals involved the recital of a catechism, wherein the initiate was asked a series of questions pertaining to the initiation symbolism and had to reply with specific answers. An example of such a catechism, apparently pertaining to the Leo grade, was discovered in a fragmentary Egyptian papyrus (Papyrus Berolinensis 21196), and reads:
{|
|
Verso
[...] He will say: 'Where [...]?'
'[...] is he at a loss there?' Say: '[...]'
[...] Say: 'Night'. He will say: 'Where [...]?'
[...] Say: 'All things [...]'
'[...] are you called?' Say: 'Because of the summery [...]'
[...] having become [...] he/it has the fiery ones
'[...] did you receive?' Say: 'In a pit'. He will say: 'Where is your [...]?'
'[...] [in the] Leonteion.' He will say: 'Will you gird [...]?'
'[...] death'. He will say: 'Why, having girded yourself, [...]?'
[...] this [has?] four tassels.
|
Recto
Very sharp and [...]
[...] much. He will say: '[...]?'
'[...] of the hot and cold'. He will say: '[...]?'
'[...] red [...] linen'. He will say: 'Why?' Say:
[...] red border; the linen, however, [...]
'[...] has been wrapped?' Say: 'The savior's [...]'
He will say: 'Who is the father?' Say: 'The one who [begets] everything [...]' 
[He will say: 'How] did you become a Leo?' Say: 'By the [...] of the father [...]'
Say: 'Drink and food'. He will say: '[...]?'
[...] in the seven-[...]
|}

Almost no Mithraic scripture or first-hand account of its highly secret rituals survives; with the exception of the aforementioned oath and catechism, and the document known as the Mithras Liturgy, from 4th century Egypt, whose status as a Mithraist text has been questioned by scholars including Franz Cumont. The walls of mithraea were commonly whitewashed, and where this survives, it tends to carry extensive repositories of graffiti; and these, together with inscriptions on Mithraic monuments, form the main source for Mithraic texts.

Feasting
It is clear from the archaeology of numerous mithraea that most rituals were associated with feasting – as eating utensils and food residues are almost invariably found. These tend to include both animal bones and also very large quantities of fruit residues. The presence of large amounts of cherry-stones in particular would tend to confirm mid-summer (late June, early July) as a season especially associated with Mithraic festivities. The Virunum album, in the form of an inscribed bronze plaque, records a Mithraic festival of commemoration as taking place on 26 June 184. Beck argues that religious celebrations on this date are indicative of special significance being given to the summer solstice; but this time of the year coincides with ancient recognition of the solar maximum at midsummer, whilst iconographically identical holidays such as Litha, Saint John's Eve, and Jāņi are observed also.

For their feasts, Mithraic initiates reclined on stone benches arranged along the longer sides of the mithraeumtypically there might be room for 15 to 30 diners, but very rarely many more than 40 men. Counterpart dining rooms, or triclinia, were to be found above ground in the precincts of almost any temple or religious sanctuary in the Roman empire, and such rooms were commonly used for their regular feasts by Roman 'clubs', or collegia. Mithraic feasts probably performed a very similar function for Mithraists as the collegia did for those entitled to join them; indeed, since qualification for Roman collegia tended to be restricted to particular families, localities or traditional trades, Mithraism may have functioned in part as providing clubs for the unclubbed. The size of the mithraeum is not necessarily an indication of the size of the congregation.

Altars, iconography, and suspected doctrinal diversity
Each mithraeum had several altars at the further end, underneath the representation of the tauroctony, and also commonly contained considerable numbers of subsidiary altars, both in the main mithraeum chamber and in the ante-chamber or narthex. These altars, which are of the standard Roman pattern, each carry a named dedicatory inscription from a particular initiate, who dedicated the altar to Mithras "in fulfillment of his vow", in gratitude for favours received.

Burned residues of animal entrails are commonly found on the main altars, indicating regular sacrificial use, though mithraea do not commonly appear to have been provided with facilities for ritual slaughter of sacrificial animals (a highly specialised function in Roman religion), and it may be presumed that a mithraeum would have made arrangements for this service to be provided for them in co-operation with the professional victimarius of the civic cult. Prayers were addressed to the Sun three times a day, and Sunday was especially sacred.

It is doubtful whether Mithraism had a monolithic and internally consistent doctrine.
It may have varied from location to location. The iconography is relatively coherent. It had no predominant sanctuary or cultic centre; and, although each mithraeum had its own officers and functionaries, there was no central supervisory authority. In some mithraea, such as that at Dura Europos, wall paintings depict prophets carrying scrolls, but no named Mithraic sages are known, nor does any reference give the title of any Mithraic scripture or teaching. It is known that initiates could transfer with their grades from one Mithraeum to another.

Mithraeum

Temples of Mithras are sunk below ground, windowless, and very distinctive. In cities, the basement of an apartment block might be converted; elsewhere they might be excavated and vaulted over, or converted from a natural cave. Mithraic temples are common in the empire; although unevenly distributed, with considerable numbers found in Rome, Ostia, Numidia, Dalmatia, Britain and along the Rhine/Danube frontier, while being somewhat less common in Greece, Egypt, and Syria. According to Walter Burkert, the secret character of Mithraic rituals meant that Mithraism could only be practiced within a Mithraeum. Some new finds at Tienen show evidence of large-scale feasting and suggest that the mystery religion may not have been as secretive as was generally believed.

For the most part, mithraea tend to be small, externally undistinguished, and cheaply constructed; the cult generally preferring to create a new centre rather than expand an existing one. The mithraeum represented the cave to which Mithras carried and then killed the bull; and where stone vaulting could not be afforded, the effect would be imitated with lath and plaster. They are commonly located close to springs or streams; fresh water appears to have been required for some Mithraic rituals, and a basin is often incorporated into the structure. There is usually a narthex or ante-chamber at the entrance, and often other ancillary rooms for storage and the preparation of food. The extant mithraea present us with actual physical remains of the architectural structures of the sacred spaces of the Mithraic cult. Mithraeum is a modern coinage and mithraists referred to their sacred structures as speleum or antrum (cave), crypta (underground hallway or corridor), fanum (sacred or holy place), or even templum (a temple or a sacred space).

In their basic form, mithraea were entirely different from the temples and shrines of other cults. In the standard pattern of Roman religious precincts, the temple building functioned as a house for the god, who was intended to be able to view, through the opened doors and columnar portico, sacrificial worship being offered on an altar set in an open courtyard – potentially accessible not only to initiates of the cult, but also to colitores or non-initiated worshippers. Mithraea were the antithesis of this.

Degrees of initiation
In the Suda under the entry Mithras, it states that "No one was permitted to be initiated into them (the mysteries of Mithras), until he should show himself holy and steadfast by undergoing several graduated tests." Gregory Nazianzen refers to the "tests in the mysteries of Mithras".

There were seven grades of initiation into Mithraism, which are listed by St. Jerome. Manfred Clauss states that the number of grades, seven, must be connected to the planets. A mosaic in the Mithraeum of Felicissimus, Ostia Antica depicts these grades, with symbolic emblems that are connected either to the grades or are symbols of the planets. The grades also have an inscription beside them commending each grade into the protection of the different planetary gods. In ascending order of importance, the initiatory grades were:
{| class="wikitable"
|- style="vertical-align:bottom;"
! Grade
! Name
! Symbols
! Planet or tutelarydeity
|-
| 
| (raven or crow)
| Beaker, caduceus
| Mercury
|-
| 
| Nymphus, Nymphobus(bridegroom)
| Lamp, hand bell, veil, circlet or diadem
| Venus
|-
| 
| Miles(soldier)
| Pouch, helmet, lance, drum, belt, breastplate
| Mars
|-
| 
| Leo(lion)
| Batillum, sistrum, laurel wreath, thunderbolts
| Jupiter
|-
| 
| Perses(Persian)
| Hooked sword, Phrygian cap, sickle, crescent moon, stars, sling, pouch
| Luna
|-
| 
| Heliodromus(sun-runner)
| Torch, images of Helios, whip, robes
| Sol
|-
| 
| Pater(father)
| Patera, mitre, shepherd's staff, garnet or ruby ring, chasuble or cape, elaborate jewel-encrusted robes, with metallic threads
| Saturn
|}

Elsewhere, as at Dura-Europos, Mithraic graffiti survive giving membership lists, in which initiates of a mithraeum are named with their Mithraic grades. At Virunum, the membership list or album sacratorum was maintained as an inscribed plaque, updated year by year as new members were initiated. By cross-referencing these lists it is possible to track some initiates from one mithraeum to another; and also speculatively to identify Mithraic initiates with persons on other contemporary lists such as military service rolls and lists of devotees of non-Mithraic religious sanctuaries. Names of initiates are also found in the dedication inscriptions of altars and other cult objects.

Clauss noted in 1990 that overall, only about 14% of Mithraic names inscribed before 250 CE identify the initiate's grade – and hence questioned the traditional view that all initiates belonged to one of the seven grades. Clauss argues that the grades represented a distinct class of priests, sacerdotes. Gordon maintains the former theory of Merkelbach and others, especially noting such examples as Dura where all names are associated with a Mithraic grade. Some scholars maintain that practice may have differed over time, or from one Mithraeum to another.

The highest grade, pater, is by far the most common one found on dedications and inscriptions – and it would appear not to have been unusual for a mithraeum to have several men with this grade. The form pater patrum (father of fathers) is often found, which appears to indicate the pater with primary status. There are several examples of persons, commonly those of higher social status, joining a mithraeum with the status pater – especially in Rome during the 'pagan revival' of the 4th century. It has been suggested that some mithraea may have awarded honorary pater status to sympathetic dignitaries.

The initiate into each grade appears to have been required to undertake a specific ordeal or test, involving exposure to heat, cold or threatened peril. An 'ordeal pit', dating to the early 3rd century, has been identified in the mithraeum at Carrawburgh. Accounts of the cruelty of the emperor Commodus describes his amusing himself by enacting Mithraic initiation ordeals in homicidal form. By the later 3rd century, the enacted trials appear to have been abated in rigor, as 'ordeal pits' were floored over.

Admission into the community was completed with a handshake with the pater, just as Mithras and Sol shook hands. The initiates were thus referred to as syndexioi (those united by the handshake). The term is used in an inscription by Proficentius
and derided by Firmicus Maternus in De errore profanarum religionum,
a 4th century Christian work attacking paganism. In ancient Iran, taking the right hand was the traditional way of concluding a treaty or signifying some solemn understanding between two parties.

Ritual re-enactments

Activities of the most prominent deities in Mithraic scenes, Sol and Mithras, were imitated in rituals by the two most senior officers in the cult's hierarchy, the Pater and the Heliodromus. The initiates held a sacramental banquet, replicating the feast of Mithras and Sol.

Reliefs on a cup found in Mainz appear to depict a Mithraic initiation. On the cup, the initiate is depicted as being led into a location where a Pater would be seated in the guise of Mithras with a drawn bow. Accompanying the initiate is a mystagogue, who explains the symbolism and theology to the initiate. The Rite is thought to re-enact what has come to be called the 'Water Miracle', in which Mithras fires a bolt into a rock, and from the rock now spouts water.

Roger Beck has hypothesized a third processional Mithraic ritual, based on the Mainz cup and Porphyrys. This scene, called 'Procession of the Sun-Runner', shows the Heliodromus escorted by two figures representing Cautes and Cautopates (see below) and preceded by an initiate of the grade Miles leading a ritual enactment of the solar journey around the mithraeum, which was intended to represent the cosmos.

Consequently, it has been argued that most Mithraic rituals involved a re-enactment by the initiates of episodes in the Mithras narrative, a narrative whose main elements were: birth from the rock, striking water from stone with an arrow shot, the killing of the bull, Sol's submission to Mithras, Mithras and Sol feasting on the bull, the ascent of Mithras to heaven in a chariot. A noticeable feature of this narrative (and of its regular depiction in surviving sets of relief carvings) is the absence of female personages (the sole exception being Luna watching the 
tauroctony in the upper corner opposite Helios).

Membership

Only male names appear in surviving inscribed membership lists. Historians including Cumont and Richard Gordon have concluded that the cult was for men only.

The ancient scholar Porphyry refers to female initiates in Mithraic rites.
The early 20th-century historian A.S. Geden wrote that this may be due to a misunderstanding. According to Geden, while the participation of women in the ritual was not unknown in the Eastern cults, the predominant military influence in Mithraism makes it unlikely in this instance. It has recently been suggested by David Jonathan that "Women were involved with Mithraic groups in at least some locations of the empire."

Soldiers were strongly represented amongst Mithraists, and also merchants, customs officials and minor bureaucrats. Few, if any, initiates came from leading aristocratic or senatorial families until the 'pagan revival' of the mid-4th century; but there were always considerable numbers of freedmen and slaves.

Ethics
Clauss suggests that a statement by Porphyry, that people initiated into the Lion grade must keep their hands pure from everything that brings pain and harm and is impure, means that moral demands were made upon members of congregations.

A passage in the Caesares of Julian the Apostate refers to "commandments of Mithras".
Tertullian, in his treatise "On the Military Crown" records that Mithraists in the army were officially excused from wearing celebratory coronets on the basis of the Mithraic initiation ritual that included refusing a proffered crown, because "their only crown was Mithras".

History and development

Mithras before the Roman Mysteries

According to the archaeologist Maarten Vermaseren, 1st century BCE evidence from Commagene demonstrates the "reverence paid to Mithras" but does not refer to "the mysteries".
In the colossal statuary erected by King Antiochus I (69–34 BCE) at Mount Nemrut, Mithras is shown beardless, wearing a Phrygian cap
(or the similar headdress – a Persian tiara), in Iranian (Parthian) clothing, and was originally seated on a throne alongside other deities and the king himself.
On the back of the thrones there is an inscription in Greek, which includes the compound name Apollo-Mithras-Helios in the genitive case.
Vermaseren also reports about a Mithras cult in 3rd century BCE. Fayum.
R.D. Barnett has argued that the royal seal of King Saussatar of the Mitanni from  depicts a tauroctonous Mithras.

Beginnings of Roman Mithraism
The origins and spread of the Mysteries have been intensely debated among scholars and there are radically differing views on these issues. According to Clauss, mysteries of Mithras were not practiced until the 1st century CE. According to Ulansey, the earliest evidence for the Mithraic mysteries places their appearance in the middle of the 1st century BCE: The historian Plutarch says that in 67 BCE the pirates of Cilicia (a province on the southeastern coast of Asia Minor) were practicing "secret rites" of Mithras. According to Daniels, whether any of this relates to the origins of the mysteries is unclear. The unique underground temples or mithraea appear suddenly in the archaeology in the last quarter of the 1st century CE.

Earliest archaeology
Inscriptions and monuments related to the Mithraic Mysteries are catalogued in a two volume work by Maarten J. Vermaseren, the Corpus Inscriptionum et Monumentorum Religionis Mithriacae (or CIMRM). The earliest monument showing Mithras slaying the bull is thought to be CIMRM 593, found in Rome.  There is no date, but the inscription tells us that it was dedicated by a certain Alcimus, steward of T. Claudius Livianus. Vermaseren and Gordon believe that this Livianus is a certain Livianus who was commander of the Praetorian guard in 101 CE, which would give an earliest date of 98–99 CE.

Five small terracotta plaques of a figure holding a knife over a bull have been excavated near Kerch in the Crimea, dated by Beskow and Clauss to the second half of the 1st century BCE, and by Beck to 50 BCE–50 CE. These may be the earliest tauroctonies, if they are accepted to be a depiction of Mithras. The bull-slaying figure wears a Phrygian cap, but is described by Beck and Beskow as otherwise unlike standard depictions of the tauroctony. Another reason for not connecting these artifacts with the Mithraic Mysteries is that the first of these plaques was found in a woman's tomb.

An altar or block from near SS. Pietro e Marcellino on the Esquiline in Rome was inscribed with a bilingual inscription by an Imperial freedman named T. Flavius Hyginus, probably between 80 and 100 CE. It is dedicated to Sol Invictus Mithras.

CIMRM 2268 is a broken base or altar from Novae/Steklen in Moesia Inferior, dated 100 CE, showing Cautes and Cautopates.

Other early archaeology includes the Greek inscription from Venosia by Sagaris actor probably from 100–150 CE; the Sidon cippus dedicated by Theodotus priest of Mithras to Asclepius, 140–141 CE; and the earliest military inscription, by C. Sacidius Barbarus, centurion of XV Apollinaris, from the bank of the Danube at Carnuntum, probably before 114 CE.

According to C.M.Daniels, the Carnuntum inscription is the earliest Mithraic dedication from the Danube region, which along with Italy is one of the two regions where Mithraism first struck root. The earliest dateable mithraeum outside Rome dates from 148 CE. The Mithraeum at Caesarea Maritima is the only one in Palestine and the date is inferred.

Earliest cult locations
According to Roger Beck, the attested locations of the Roman cult in the earliest phase are as follows:

Mithraea datable from pottery
 Nida/Heddernheim III (Germania Sup.)
 Mogontiacum (Germania Sup.)
 Pons Aeni (Noricum)
 Caesarea Maritima (Judaea)
Datable dedications
 Nida/Heddernheim I (Germania Sup.) (CIMRM 1091/2, 1098)
 Carnuntum III (Pannonia Sup.) (CIMRM 1718)
 Novae (Moesia Inf.) (CIMRM 2268/9)
 Oescus (Moesia Inf.) (CIMRM 2250)
 Rome (CIMRM 362, 593/4)

Classical literature about Mithras and the Mysteries

According to Boyce, the earliest literary references to the mysteries are by the Latin poet Statius, about 80 CE, and Plutarch (c. 100 CE).

Statius
The Thebaid an epic poem by Statius, pictures Mithras in a cave, wrestling with something that has horns. The context is a prayer to the god Phoebus. The cave is described as persei, which in this context is usually translated Persian. According to the translator J.H. Mozley it literally means Persean, referring to Perses, the son of Perseus and Andromeda, this Perses being the ancestor of the Persians according to Greek legend.

Justin Martyr
Writing in approximately 145 CE, the early Christian apologist Justin Martyr charges the cult of Mithras with imitating the Christian communion,
Which the wicked devils have imitated in the mysteries of Mithras, commanding the same things to be done. For, that bread and a cup of water are placed, with certain incantations, in the mystic rites of one who is being initiated, you either know or can learn.

Plutarch
The Greek biographer Plutarch (46–127 CE) says that "secret mysteries ... of Mithras" were practiced by the pirates of Cilicia, the coastal province in the southeast of Anatolia, who were active in the 1st century BCE: "They likewise offered strange sacrifices; those of Olympus I mean; and they celebrated certain secret mysteries, among which those of Mithras continue to this day, being originally instituted by them." He mentions that the pirates were especially active during the Mithridatic wars (between the Roman Republic and King Mithridates VI of Pontus) in which they supported the king. The association between Mithridates and the pirates is also mentioned by the ancient historian Appian.
The 4th century commentary on Vergil by Servius says that Pompey settled some of these pirates in Calabria in southern Italy.

Dio Cassius
The historian Dio Cassius (2nd to 3rd century CE) tells how the name of Mithras was spoken during the state visit to Rome of Tiridates I of Armenia, during the reign of Nero. (Tiridates was the son of Vonones II of Parthia, and his coronation by Nero in 66 CE confirmed the end of a war between Parthia and Rome.) Dio Cassius writes that Tiridates, as he was about to receive his crown, told the Roman emperor that he revered him "as Mithras". Roger Beck thinks it possible that this episode contributed to the emergence of Mithraism as a popular religion in Rome.

Porphyry

The philosopher Porphyry (3rd–4th century CE) gives an account of the origins of the Mysteries in his work De antro nympharum (The Cave of the Nymphs). Citing Eubulus as his source, Porphyry writes that the original temple of Mithras was a natural cave, containing fountains, which Zoroaster found in the mountains of Persia. To Zoroaster, this cave was an image of the whole world, so he consecrated it to Mithras, the creator of the world. Later in the same work, Porphyry links Mithras and the bull with planets and star-signs: Mithras himself is associated with the sign of Aries and the planet Mars, while the bull is associated with Venus.

Porphyry is writing close to the demise of the cult, and Robert Turcan has challenged the idea that Porphyry's statements about Mithraism are accurate. His case is that far from representing what Mithraists believed, they are merely representations by the Neoplatonists of what it suited them in the late 4th century to read into the mysteries. Merkelbach and Beck believed Porphyry's work "is in fact thoroughly coloured with the doctrines of the Mysteries".
Beck holds that classical scholars have neglected Porphyry's evidence and have taken an unnecessarily skeptical view of Porphyry. According to Beck, Porphyry's De antro is the only clear text from antiquity which tells us about the intent of the Mithraic Mysteries and how that intent was realized. David Ulansey finds it important that Porphyry "confirms ... that astral conceptions played an important role in Mithraism."

Mithras Liturgy
In later antiquity, the Greek name of Mithras (Μίθρας ) occurs in the text known as the "Mithras Liturgy", a part of the Paris Greek Magical Papyrus (Paris Bibliothèque Nationale Suppl. gr. 574);  here Mithras is given the epithet "the great god", and is identified with the sun god Helios. There have been different views among scholars as to whether this text is an expression of Mithraism as such. Franz Cumont argued that it isn't; Marvin Meyer thinks it is; while Hans Dieter Betz sees it as a synthesis of Greek, Egyptian, and Mithraic traditions.

Modern origin debate

Cumont's hypothesis: from Persian state religion

Scholarship on Mithras begins with Franz Cumont, who published a two volume collection of source texts and images of monuments in French in 1894–1900, Textes et monuments figurés relatifs aux mystères de Mithra [French: Texts and Illustrated Monuments Relating to the Mysteries of Mithra]. An English translation of part of this work was published in 1903, with the title The Mysteries of Mithra. Cumont's hypothesis, as the author summarizes it in the first 32 pages of his book, was that the Roman religion was "the Roman form of Mazdaism", the Persian state religion, disseminated from the East. He identified the ancient Aryan deity who appears in Persian literature as Mithras with the Hindu god Mitra of the Vedic hymns. According to Cumont, the god Mithra came to Rome "accompanied by a large representation of the Mazdean Pantheon". Cumont considers that while the tradition "underwent some modification in the Occident ... the alterations that it suffered were largely superficial".

Criticisms and reassessments of Cumont
Cumont's theories came in for severe criticism from John R. Hinnells and R.L. Gordon at the First International Congress of Mithraic Studies held in 1971.
John Hinnells was unwilling to reject entirely the idea of Iranian origin, but wrote: "we must now conclude that his reconstruction simply will not stand. It receives no support from the Iranian material and is in fact in conflict with the ideas of that tradition as they are represented in the extant texts. Above all, it is a theoretical reconstruction which does not accord with the actual Roman iconography." He discussed Cumont's reconstruction of the bull-slaying scene and stated "that the portrayal of Mithras given by Cumont is not merely unsupported by Iranian texts but is actually in serious conflict with known Iranian theology."
Another paper by R.L. Gordon argued that Cumont severely distorted the available evidence by forcing the material to conform to his predetermined model of Zoroastrian origins. Gordon suggested that the theory of Persian origins was completely invalid and that the Mithraic mysteries in the West were an entirely new creation.

A similar view has been expressed by Luther H. Martin: "Apart from the name of the god himself, in other words, Mithraism seems to have developed largely in and is, therefore, best understood from the context of Roman culture."

According to Hopfe, "All theories of the origin of Mithraism acknowledge a connection, however vague, to the Mithra/Mitra figure of ancient Aryan religion." Reporting on the Second International Congress of Mithraic Studies, 1975, Ugo Bianchi says that although he welcomes "the tendency to question in historical terms the relations between Eastern and Western Mithraism", it "should not mean obliterating what was clear to the Romans themselves, that Mithras was a 'Persian' (in wider perspective: an Indo-Iranian) god."

Boyce wrote, "no satisfactory evidence has yet been adduced to show that, before Zoroaster, the concept of a supreme god existed among the Iranians, or that among them Mithra – or any other divinity – ever enjoyed a separate cult of his or her own outside either their ancient or their Zoroastrian pantheons." She also said that although recent studies have minimized the Iranizing aspects of the self-consciously Persian religion "at least in the form which it attained under the Roman Empire", the name Mithras is enough to show "that this aspect is of some importance". She also says that "the Persian affiliation of the Mysteries is acknowledged in the earliest literary references to them."

Beck tells us that since the 1970s scholars have generally rejected Cumont, but adds that recent theories about how Zoroastrianism was during the period BCE now make some new form of Cumont's east-west transfer possible.
He says that

... an indubitable residuum of things Persian in the Mysteries and a better knowledge of what constituted actual Mazdaism have allowed modern scholars to postulate for Roman Mithraism a continuing Iranian theology. This indeed is the main line of Mithraic scholarship, the Cumontian model which subsequent scholars accept, modify, or reject. For the transmission of Iranian doctrine from East to West, Cumont postulated a plausible, if hypothetical, intermediary: the Magusaeans of the Iranian diaspora in Anatolia. More problematic – and never properly addressed by Cumont or his successors – is how real-life Roman Mithraists subsequently maintained a quite complex and sophisticated Iranian theology behind an occidental facade. Other than the images at Dura of the two 'magi' with scrolls, there is no direct and explicit evidence for the carriers of such doctrines. ... Up to a point, Cumont's Iranian paradigm, especially in Turcan's modified form, is certainly plausible.

He also says that "the old Cumontian model of formation in, and diffusion from, Anatolia ... is by no means dead – nor should it be."

Modern theories

Beck theorizes that the cult was created in Rome, by a single founder who had some knowledge of both Greek and Oriental religion, but suggests that some of the ideas used may have passed through the Hellenistic kingdoms. He observes that "Mithras – moreover, a Mithras who was identified with the Greek Sun god Helios" was among the gods of the syncretic Greco-Armenian-Iranian royal cult at Nemrut, founded by Antiochus I of Commagene in the mid 1st century BCE. While proposing the theory, Beck says that his scenario may be regarded as Cumontian in two ways. Firstly, because it looks again at Anatolia and Anatolians, and more importantly, because it hews back to the methodology first used by Cumont.

Merkelbach suggests that its mysteries were essentially created by a particular person or persons and created in a specific place, the city of Rome, by someone from an eastern province or border state who knew the Iranian myths in detail, which he wove into his new grades of initiation; but that he must have been Greek and Greek-speaking because he incorporated elements of Greek Platonism into it. The myths, he suggests, were probably created in the milieu of the imperial bureaucracy, and for its members. Clauss tends to agree. Beck calls this "the most likely scenario" and states "Until now, Mithraism has generally been treated as if it somehow evolved Topsy-like from its Iranian precursor – a most implausible scenario once it is stated explicitly."

Archaeologist Lewis M. Hopfe notes that there are only three mithraea in Roman Syria, in contrast to further west. He writes: "Archaeology indicates that Roman Mithraism had its epicenter in Rome ... the fully developed religion known as Mithraism seems to have begun in Rome and been carried to Syria by soldiers and merchants."

Taking a different view from other modern scholars, Ulansey argues that the Mithraic mysteries began in the Greco-Roman world as a religious response to the discovery by the Greek astronomer Hipparchus of the astronomical phenomenon of the precession of the equinoxes – a discovery that amounted to discovering that the entire cosmos was moving in a hitherto unknown way. This new cosmic motion, he suggests, was seen by the founders of Mithraism as indicating the existence of a powerful new god capable of shifting the cosmic spheres and thereby controlling the universe.

A. D. H. Bivar, L. A. Campbell, and G. Widengren have variously argued that Roman Mithraism represents a continuation of some form of Iranian Mithra worship. More recently, Parvaneh Pourshariati has made similar claims.

According to Antonia Tripolitis, Roman Mithraism originated in Vedic India and picked up many features of the cultures which it encountered in its westward journey.

Later history
The first important expansion of the mysteries in the Empire seems to have happened quite quickly, late in the reign of Antoninus Pius (b. 121 CE, d. 161 CE) and under Marcus Aurelius. By this time all the key elements of the mysteries were in place.

Mithraism reached the apogee of its popularity during the 2nd and 3rd centuries, spreading at an "astonishing" rate at the same period when the worship of Sol Invictus was incorporated into the state-sponsored cults.</ref>
At this period a certain Pallas devoted a monograph to Mithras, and a little later Euboulus wrote a History of Mithras, although both works are now lost.
According to the 4th century Historia Augusta, the emperor Commodus participated in its mysteries but it never became one of the state cults.

The historian Jacob Burckhardt writes:

Persecution and Christianization
The religion and its followers faced persecution in the 4th century from Christianization, and Mithraism came to an end at some point between its last decade and the 5th century. Ulansey states that "Mithraism declined with the rise to power of Christianity, until the beginning of the fifth century, when Christianity became strong enough to exterminate by force rival religions such as Mithraism." According to Speidel, Christians fought fiercely with this feared enemy and suppressed it during the late 4th century. Mithraic sanctuaries were destroyed and religion was no longer a matter of personal choice. According to Luther H. Martin, Roman Mithraism came to an end with the anti-pagan decrees of the Christian emperor Theodosius during the last decade of the 4th century.

Clauss states that inscriptions show Mithras as one of the cults listed on inscriptions by Roman senators who had not converted to Christianity, as part of the "pagan revival" among the elite in the second half of the 4th century.
Beck states that "Quite early in the [fourth] century the religion was as good as dead throughout the empire." Archaeological evidence indicates the continuance of the cult of Mithras up until the end of the 4th century. In particular, large numbers of votive coins deposited by worshippers have been recovered at the Mithraeum at Pons Sarravi (Sarrebourg) in Gallia Belgica, in a series that runs from Gallienus (r. 253–268) to Theodosius I (r. 379–395). These were scattered over the floor when the mithraeum was destroyed, as Christians apparently regarded the coins as polluted; therefore, providing reliable dates for the functioning of the mithraeum up until near the end of the century.

Franz Cumont states that Mithraism may have survived in certain remote cantons of the Alps and Vosges into the 5th century. According to Mark Humphries, the deliberate concealment of Mithraic cult objects in some areas suggests that precautions were being taken against Christian attacks. In areas like the Rhine frontier, barbarian invasions may have also played a role in the end of Mithraism.

At some of the mithraeums that have been found below churches, such as the Santa Prisca Mithraeum and the San Clemente Mithraeum, the ground plan of the church above was made in a way to symbolize Christianity's domination of Mithraism.  The cult disappeared earlier than that of Isis. Isis was still remembered in the Middle Ages as a pagan deity, but Mithras was already forgotten in late antiquity. 

"John, the Lord Chamberlain", a 1999–2014 series of historical mystery novels, depicts a secret Mithraist community still active in Justinian's court (r. 527–567), but there is no historical evidence for such a late survival of the religion.

Interpretations of the bull-slaying scene

According to Cumont, the imagery of the tauroctony was a Graeco-Roman representation of an event in Zoroastrian cosmogony described in a 9th-century Zoroastrian text, the Bundahishn. In this text the evil spirit Ahriman (not Mithra) slays the primordial creature Gavaevodata, which is represented as a bovine. Cumont held that a version of the myth must have existed in which Mithras, not Ahriman, killed the bovine. But according to Hinnells, no such variant of the myth is known, and that this is merely speculation: "In no known Iranian text [either Zoroastrian or otherwise] does Mithra slay a bull."

David Ulansey finds astronomical evidence from the mithraeum itself. He reminds us that the Platonic writer Porphyry wrote in the 3rd century CE that the cave-like temple Mithraea depicted "an image of the world"{{efn|
10: "Since, however, a cavern is an image and symbol of the world ..." and that Zoroaster consecrated a cave resembling the world fabricated by Mithras.
The ceiling of the Caesarea Maritima Mithraeum retains traces of blue paint, which may mean the ceiling was painted to depict the sky and the stars.

Beck has given the following celestial composition of the Tauroctony:
{| class="wikitable"
|-
! Component of Tauroctony
! Celestial counterpart
|-
| Bull
| Taurus
|-
| Sol
| Sun
|-
| Luna
| Moon
|-
| Dog
| Canis Minor, Canis Major
|-
| Snake
| Hydra, Serpens, Draco
|-
| Raven
| Corvus
|-
| Scorpion
| Scorpius
|-
| Wheat's ear (on bull's tail)
| Spica
|-
| Twins Cautes and Cautopates
| Gemini
|-
| Lion
| Leo
|-
| Crater
| Crater
|-
| Cave
| Universe
|}

Several celestial identities for the Tauroctonous Mithras (TM) himself have been proposed. Beck summarizes them in the table below.
{| class="wikitable"t
|-
! Scholar
! Identifies tauroctonous Mithras (TM) as
|-
| Bausani, A. (1979)
| TM associated with Leo, in that the tauroctony is a typeof the ancient lion–bull (Leo–Taurus) combat motif. 
|-
| Beck, R.L. (1994)
| TM = Sun in Leo
|-
| Insler, S. (1978)
| [tauroctony = heliacal setting of Taurus]
|-
| Jacobs, B. (1999)
| [tauroctony = heliacal setting of Taurus]
|-
| North, J.D. (1990)
| TM = Betelgeuse (Alpha Orionis) setting,TM knife = Triangulum setting,TM cloak = Capella (Alpha Aurigae) setting.
|-
| Rutgers, A.J. (1970)
| TM = Sun,Bull = Moon
|-
| Sandelin, K.-G. (1988)
| TM = Auriga
|-
| Speidel, M.P. (1980)
| TM = Orion
|-
| Ulansey, D. (1989)
| TM = Perseus
|-
| Weiss, M. (1994, 1998)
| TM = the Night Sky
|}

Ulansey has proposed that Mithras seems to have been derived from the constellation of Perseus, which is positioned just above Taurus in the night sky. He sees iconographic and mythological parallels between the two figures: both are young heroes, carry a dagger, and wear a Phrygian cap. He also mentions the similarity of the image of Perseus killing the Gorgon and the tauroctony, both figures being associated with caverns and both having connections to Persia as further evidence.
Michael Speidel associates Mithras with the constellation of Orion because of the proximity to Taurus, and the consistent nature of the depiction of the figure as having wide shoulders, a garment flared at the hem, and narrowed at the waist with a belt, thus taking on the form of the constellation.

Beck has criticized Speidel and Ulansey of adherence to a literal cartographic logic, describing their theories as a "will-o'-the-wisp" that "lured them down a false trail". He argues that a literal reading of the tauroctony as a star chart raises two major problems: it is difficult to find a constellation counterpart for Mithras himself (despite efforts by Speidel and Ulansey) and that, unlike in a star chart, each feature of the tauroctony might have more than a single counterpart. Rather than seeing Mithras as a constellation, Beck argues that Mithras is the prime traveller on the celestial stage (represented by the other symbols of the scene), the Unconquered Sun moving through the constellations. But again, Meyer holds that the Mithras Liturgy reflects the world of Mithraism and may be a confirmation for Ulansey's theory of Mithras being held responsible for the precession of equinoxes.

Comparable belief systems

The cult of Mithras was part of the syncretic nature of ancient Roman religion. Almost all Mithraea contain statues dedicated to gods of other cults, and it is common to find inscriptions dedicated to Mithras in other sanctuaries, especially those of Jupiter Dolichenus. Mithraism was not an alternative to Rome's other traditional religions, but was one of many forms of religious practice, and many Mithraic initiates can also be found participating in the civic religion, and as initiates of other mystery cults.

Christianity

Early Christian apologists noted similarities between Mithraic and Christian rituals, but nonetheless took an extremely negative view of Mithraism: they interpreted Mithraic rituals as evil copies of Christian ones. For instance, Tertullian wrote that as a prelude to the Mithraic initiation ceremony, the initiate was given a ritual bath and at the end of the ceremony, received a mark on the forehead. He described these rites as a diabolical counterfeit of the baptism and chrismation of Christians. Justin Martyr contrasted Mithraic initiation communion with the Eucharist:
Wherefore also the evil demons in mimicry have handed down that the same thing should be done in the Mysteries of Mithras. For that bread and a cup of water are in these mysteries set before the initiate with certain speeches you either know or can learn.

Ernest Renan suggested in 1882 that, under different circumstances, Mithraism might have risen to the prominence of modern-day Christianity. Renan wrote: "If the growth of Christianity had been arrested by some mortal malady, the world would have been Mithraic".
This theory has since been contested. Leonard Boyle wrote in 1987 that "too much ... has been made of the 'threat' of Mithraism to Christianity",
pointing out that there are only fifty known mithraea in the entire city of Rome. J.A. Ezquerra holds that since the two religions did not share similar aims, there was never any real threat of Mithraism taking over the Roman world.
Mithraism had backing from the Roman aristocracy during a time when their conservative values were seen as under attack during the rising tides of Christianity.

According to Mary Boyce, Mithraism was a potent enemy for Christianity in the West, though she is sceptical about its hold in the East.
F. Coarelli (1979) has tabulated forty actual or possible Mithraea and estimated that Rome would have had "not less than 680–690" mithraea.
L.M. Hopfe states that more than 400 Mithraic sites have been found. These sites are spread all over the Roman empire from places as far as Dura Europos in the east, and England in the west. He, too, says that Mithraism may have been a rival of Christianity. David Ulansey thinks Renan's statement "somewhat exaggerated", but does consider Mithraism "one of Christianity's major competitors in the Roman Empire". Ulansey sees the study of Mithraism as important for understanding "the cultural matrix out of which the Christian religion came to birth".

See also
 London Mithraeum
 Maitreya
 Mithra
 Mehregan
 Roman–Iranian relations
 Santo Stefano al Monte Celio#Mithraeum
 Tienen Mithraeum

Footnotes

References

Further reading 

 
 
 
 
 
 
 
 
 
 
 
 Mastrocinque, Attilio, Studi sul mitraismo:il mitraismo e la magia.
 Mastrocinque, Attilio, Des Mysteres de Mithra Aux Mysteres de Jesus.
 Turcan, Robert, The Gods of Ancient Rome: Religion in everyday life from archaic to imperial.
 Turcan, Robert, Note sur la liturgie mithriaque [Note on the Mithraic Liturgy].
 Hutton, Ronald, The Pagan Religions of the Ancient British Isles:Their Nature and Legacy.
 Gawlikowski, Michal, Hawarte Preliminary Report.
 Gawlikowski, Michal, Hawarte Excavations, 1999.
 Majcherek, Grzegorz, Hawarte:Excavation and restoration work in 2003.
 Gawlikowski, Michal, The mithraeum at Hawarte and its paintings,  Journal of Roman archaeology, Vol. 20, Nº. 1, 2007, pp. 337–361.
 Moga, Iulian, Mithra în asia mică şi în regiunile limitrofe. Mirajul originilor. [Mithra in Asia Minor and in regions close].
 Sauer, Eberhard, The end of paganism in the north-western provinces of the Roman Empire:The example of the Mithras cult.
 
 Walters, Vivienne J., The cult of Mithras in the Roman provinces of Gaul, Brill
 Bianchi, Ugo, The history of religions.
 Bivar, A. D. H., The personalities of Mithra in archaeology and literature
 Bivar, A. D. H., Mithraic symbols on a medallion of Buyid Iran?.
 Bromiley, Geoffrey W., revised edition edited by Kyle, Melvin Grove, The international standard Bible encyclopedia
 Duchesne-Guillemin, Jacques, Etudes mithriaques: actes du 2e congrès international. (Some portions are in English).
 Harris, J. R. "Mithras at Hermopolis and Memphis", in Donald M. Bailey (ed), Archaeological Research in Roman Egypt (2004). Journal of Roman Archaeology.
 Kaper, Olaf E., "Mithras im ptolemäischen Ägypten", in Peter C. Bol, Gabriele Kaminski, and Caterina Maderna (eds), Fremdheit-Eigenheit: Ägypten, Griechenland und Rom : Austausch und Verständnis (2004). Prestel.
 Lane Fox, Robin, Pagans and Christians.
 Nicholson, Oliver, The end of Mithraism, Antiquity, Volume: 69  Number: 263  Page: 358–362.
 
 Roll, Israel, The mysteries of Mithras in the Roman Orient:the problem of origin.
 Mary Beard, John A. North, S. R. F. Price, Religions of Rome: A history.
 Mary Beard, John A. North, S. R. F. Price, Religions of Rome: A Sourcebook.
 Will, Ernest, Le relief cultuel gréco-romain, (1955).
 Nilsson, Martin P., Geschichte der griechischen Religion, Volume 2.
 Marleen Martens, Guy De Boe, Roman Mithraism, (2004).
 Athanassiadi, P. A contribution to Mithraic Theology: The Emperor Julian's Hymn to King Helios.
 Gwynn, David M., Religious diversity in late antiquity.
 Weitzmann, Kurt, ed., Age of spirituality: late antique and early Christian art, third to seventh century, no. 173-175, 1979, Metropolitan Museum of Art, New York, ; full text available online from The Metropolitan Museum of Art Libraries
 Pourshariati, Parvaneh  The Epic of Samak Ayar: Lecture at the European Iranology Conference, Berlin, 2019.

External links

 
 Ostia Antica Mithraeum at the Baths of Mithras. (YouTube video)
 Mithraeum A website with a collection of monuments and bibliography about Mithraism.
 Cumont, "The Mysteries Of Mithra"
 Google Maps: Map of the locations of Mithraea
 Archaeology magazine A publication of the Archaeological Institute of America
 A list of Mithraea
 Article on Franz Cumont
 Ostia Mithraea
 Literary sources
 A gallery of monuments and inscriptions
 Cult of Mithras Explained (YouTube video - with references)

 
Christianity in the Roman Empire
Persecution of pagans in the late Roman Empire
Roman–Iranian relations
Solar gods